UHC Stockerau, also known as UHC Müllner Bau Stockerau is a handball club from Stockerau in Austria. Women's UHC Stockerau competes in the Women Handball Liga Austria.

Honours

Women's handball 
Women Handball Austria:
Runners-up (1): 2018
ÖHB Cup:
Winners (1): 2018
Runners-up (1): 2022

European record

Team

Current squad 

Squad for the 2022–23 season

Goalkeepers
 1  Mateja Serafimova
 12  Isabel Bernhard

Wingers
RW
 6  Laura Klinger
 19  Nina Müller
 23  Viktoria Mauler
LW 
 7  Ines Rein
Line Players 
 17  Carina Ganl
 21  Diana Michalkova

Back players
LB
 5  Sandra Hart
 25  Maria Lauermann
 99  Melissa Begovic
CB 
 3  Sandra Zeitelberger
 13  Dominika Kodajova
 20  Anna Habermüller
RB
 9  Hanna Feuerstein
 29  Theres Kovarik

Transfers 
Transfers for the 2023-24 season

 Joining
 
 Leaving

References
 Official website
 EHF Club profile

Austrian handball clubs